Mount Marshall is a mountain located in Essex County, New York. 
Originally named for Governor DeWitt Clinton, and then for Herbert Clark, it was renamed for wilderness activist Bob Marshall (1901–1939) after his death.  Marshall is part of the MacIntyre Mountains.  Mount Marshall is flanked to the northeast by Iroquois Peak, and faces Wallface Mountain to the northwest across Indian Pass.

The northeast end of Mount Marshall drains into Cold Brook, thence into Lake Colden, the Flowed Lands, the Opalescent River, the Hudson River, and into New York Bay.
The east side of Mt. Marshall drains into Herbert Brook, thence into the Flowed Lands.
The southwest end of Mt. Marshall drains into Calamity Brook, thence into the Hudson River.
The west side of Marshall drains into the southern Indian Pass Brook, thence into Henderson Lake, the source of the Hudson River.
The north side of Marshall drains into the northern Indian Pass Brook, thence into the West Branch of the Ausable River, into Lake Champlain, thence into Canada's Richelieu River, the Saint Lawrence River, and into the Gulf of Saint Lawrence.

Mount Marshall is within the High Peaks Wilderness Area of New York's Adirondack Park.

See also 
 List of mountains in New York
 Northeast 111 4,000-footers 
 Adirondack High Peaks
 Adirondack Forty-Sixers

Notes

External links 
 

Mountains of Essex County, New York
Adirondack High Peaks
Mountains of New York (state)